Jonathan E. Sheppard (born December 2, 1940 in Ashwell, Hertfordshire, England) is an English Hall of Fame trainer in American Thoroughbred horse racing.

Sheppard came to the United States in 1961 and in 1966 won his first race with Haffaday in a steeplechase event at My Lady's Manor, Maryland. In 1973 he won his first earnings championship in steeplechase racing. He went on to win the earnings title another twenty-three times. He has trained the winner of four Breeders' Cup Grand National Steeplechase and holds the record for most wins in the Colonial Cup Steeplechase with eleven. Sheppard is the only trainer to win the American steeplechase Triple Crown, doing it with Flatterer, the only horse to win the Eclipse Award for Outstanding Steeplechase horse four years in a row.

In addition to steeplechase racing, Sheppard has met with considerable success in flat racing. In both venues, he has had a long working relationship with stable owner, George W. Strawbridge Jr., and in 2008 he conditioned Strawbridge's filly Forever Together to victory in the Breeders' Cup Filly & Mare Turf.

In 1990, he was inducted into the National Museum of Racing and Hall of Fame.

In 2004, Sheppard was elected president of the National Steeplechase Association.

In 2008, Sheppard joined fellow Hall of Famee inductee Sidney Watters, Jr. as the only men in American racing to have trained a champion over both jumps and on the flat. As of 2010, Sheppard's horses have won twelve Eclipse Awards:
 Athenian Idol (1973)
 Cafe Prince (1977, 1978)
 Martie's Anger (1979)
 Flatterer (1983, 1984, 1985, 1986)
 Jimmy Lorenzo (1988)
 Highland Bud (1989)
 Forever Together (2008)
 Informed Decision (2009)
 Divine Fortune (2013)

Leading US steeplechase trainer of all time in victories and earnings 
On September 25, 2010, he achieved the milestone of getting his 1,000th steeplechase victory as a trainer. At Monmouth Park Racetrack his trainee Arcadius took the $100,000 Helen Haskell Sampson Stake (NSA-G1) by a length under Brian Crowley. He became the first trainer to send out 1,000 jump winners in the United States. The milestone is considered all the more impressive with the low annual volume of National Steeplechase Association sanctioned races. In 2008, for example, there were a total of only 168 jump races held that year in the US.

On October 29, 2011 (with the victory of the runner 'Dugan' at the Aiken Fall Races) Sheppard's career winnings in National Steeplechase Association races rose by $9,000 (USD) to $20,002,192. The British-born trainer is the first in the American sport ever to pass the $20-million mark, unadjusted for inflation. His closest competitor, Jack Fisher, has yet to hit the $10,000,000 mark.

Noted flat achievement milestone accomplished with victories
Jonathan Sheppard achieved his 3,000th win as a flat trainer Monday September 17, 2012, when Fugitive Angel won the seventh race at Delaware Park in Stanton, Delaware. Sheppard became the 28th trainer in North American racing history to hit the milestone. The 5-year-old horse was bred and is owned by longtime client George Strawbridge Jr. and his Augustin Stables.

Saratoga Race Course achievements
Sheppard has won at least one race in every annual [Saratoga Race Course] meet since 1969 through and including 2015, 47 years, which is a record streak for any trainer. His 1st 2015 Race Meet victory was scored by Lune de Caro (TX) in a steeplechase race August 18, 2015. Jonathan remarked to the Times Union, "“I said if I didn’t win one (at Saratoga) this year, I wouldn’t come back” 

His winning streak of a win every summer at Saratoga ended with the 2015 meet. No trips to the winner's circle for Sheppard at Saratoga for the 2016 meet and thus ending the streek at 47.

He was the leading Saratoga trainer in 1984 and 1985.

References

External links
 Jonathan Sheppard at the National Museum of Racing and Hall of Fame
 October 23, 2008 Bloodhorse.com article titled Sheppard, Strawbridge Together 42 Years
 Brisnet Arcadius gives Sheppard milestone win
 Racing Post Sep. 26, 2010 1,000th winner for US jumps legend Sheppard
  Equibase trainer record: Jonathan E. Sheppard

1940 births
Living people
American horse trainers
American racehorse owners and breeders
United States Thoroughbred Racing Hall of Fame inductees
People from Ashwell, Hertfordshire